Eleutheria is a genus of hydrozoans belonging to the family Cladonematidae.

The species of this genus are found in Europe and Australia.

Species:

Eleutheria claparedii 
Eleutheria dichotoma 
Eleutheria heptonema

References

Cladonematidae
Hydrozoan genera